Donough O'Brien, 2nd Earl of Thomond (died 1 April 1553), also known as "the fat", was the son of Connor O'Brien, King of Thomond and Annabell Burke. He inherited the earldom from his uncle, Murrough O'Brien, by special remainder.

O'Brien married Helen Butler, daughter of Piers Butler, 8th Earl of Ormonde and Lady Margaret Fitzgerald. He died on 1 April 1553, after being attacked by his brothers at the family seat of Clonroad. O'Brien's brother Sir Donald was named king of Thomond by the Dalgais, but O'Brien's son, Connor, allied himself with the English and regained control of his lands.

Children of Donough O'Brien and Helen Butler:
Margaret O'Brien (d. 1568) married Dermod O'Brien, 2nd Baron Inchiquin [she was (also) married to the 2nd Earl of Clanricard according to the Wikipedia entry for him: Richard Burke, 2nd Earl of Clanricarde
Connor O'Brien, 3rd Earl of Thomond (c. 1534 – 1581)
Donal or Daniel
Honora married Teige Macnamara

Notes

References

Further reading

People from County Clare
16th-century Irish people
Peers of Ireland created by Henry VIII
1553 deaths
Donough
Kings of Thomond
Year of birth unknown
Earls of Thomond
Irish chiefs of the name